The 1973 Richmond 500 was a NASCAR Winston Cup Series racing event that took place on February 25, 1973, at Richmond Fairgrounds Raceway (now Richmond Raceway) in Richmond, Virginia.

Background
In 1953, Richmond International Raceway began hosting the Grand National Series with Lee Petty winning that first race in Richmond.  The original track was paved in 1968.  In 1988, the track was re-designed into its present D-shaped configuration

The name for the raceway complex was "Strawberry Hill" until the Virginia State Fairgrounds site was bought out in 1999 and renamed the "Richmond International Raceway".

Race report
Five hundred laps took place on a paved oval track spanning  for a grand total of .It took three hours and thirty-seven minutes for the race to conclude in front of eighteen thousand spectators.

Notable crew chiefs that were a part of the race included Herb Nab, Bud Moore, Lee Gordon, Vic Ballard, Dale Inman and Harry Hyde. Richard Petty defeated Buddy Baker by 13.6 seconds, bringing about Petty's 150th NASCAR Cup Series career win.

Eight cautions for seventy-eight laps slowed the race. The other drivers in the top ten were: Cale Yarborough, Bobby Isaac, Dave Marcis, Bill Dennis, Lennie Pond, Cecil Gordon, James Hylton, and Benny Parsons. Though Lennie Pond made his debut four years prior, this was only his third career start, and it yielded his first top-10.

Canadian driver Vic Parsons started in 27th place and ended the race in 30th place (out of 30 drivers). J.D. McDuffie would ruin his vehicle's engine on lap 54 while David Sisco would do the same thing on lap 110. Engine problems would also claim the vehicles of Dean Dalton on lap 126, Ray Hendrick on lap 151 and Donnie Allison on lap 162. Neil Castles' vehicle would suffer from terminal damage due to a crash on lap 210 while Tiny Lund would lose his vehicle's rear end on lap 229. Frank Warren's vehicles ran out of tires on lap 237 while a crash would cause terminal damage to Sonny Hutchins' vehicle on lap 254. Richard D. Howard would acquire the final DNF of the race due to engine problems on lap 349.

Total winnings for this race were $35,600 ($ when considering inflation). DiGard Motorsports would throw their collective hats into what would become their debut race as a NASCAR Cup Series team.

Qualifying

Finishing order
Section reference: 

 Richard Petty (No. 43)
 Buddy Baker† (No. 71)
 Cale Yarborough (No. 11)
 Bobby Isaac† (No. 15)
 Dave Marcis (No. 2)
 Bill Dennis (No. 17)
 Lennie Pond (No. 54)
 Cecil Gordon† (No. 24)
 James Hylton† (No. 48)
 Benny Parsons† (No. 72)
 Walter Ballard (No. 30)
 Elmo Langley† (No. 64)
 Jabe Thomas (No. 25)
 Bill Champion† (No. 10)
 Bobby Allison (No. 12)
 Henley Gray (No. 19)
 Buddy Arrington (No. 67)
 Charlie Roberts (No. 77)
 John Sears† (No. 4)
 Richard D. Brown* (No. 51)
 Sonny Hutchins*† (No. 82)
 Frank Warren*† (No. 79)
 Tiny Lund*† (No. 55)
 Neil Castles* (No. 06)
 Donnie Allison* (No. 59)
 Ray Hendrick*† (No. 90)
 Dean Dalton* (No. 7)
 David Sisco* (No. 05)
 J.D. McDuffie*† (No. 70)
 Vic Parsons* (No. 45)

* Driver failed to finish race 
† signifies that the driver is known to be deceased

References

Richmond 500
Virginia
NASCAR races at Richmond Raceway